is a private junior college in Fukuoka, Fukuoka, Japan, established in 1997.

External links
 Official website

Japanese junior colleges
Educational institutions established in 1997
Private universities and colleges in Japan
Universities and colleges in Fukuoka Prefecture
1997 establishments in Japan